Dr. Gary K. Beauchamp was the director and president of the Monell Chemical Senses Center from August 1990 to September 2014.

Dr. Beauchamp graduated from Carleton College in 1965 with a bachelor's degree in biology. He received his Ph.D. in biopsychology in 1971 from The Pritzker School of Medicine of the University of Chicago. He joined the newly established Monell Center as a postdoctoral fellow in 1971, was appointed to the faculty in 1973, and attained the rank of Member in 1981.

Dr. Beauchamp maintains an active research program at Monell, exploring varied topics related to taste, olfaction, and chemesthesis. Trained as a psychobiologist, his research has contributed to advancements in the fields of developmental psychology, physiological psychology, and perception; he also has made important contributions to the fields of genetics, developmental biology, immunobiology, ethology, and molecular biology.

Considered one of the world's leading experts on chemosensory science, Dr. Beauchamp serves as a scientific advisor to numerous governmental and private organizations, including the National Science Foundation, National Institutes of Health, and  Institute of Medicine.

During the 2009–2010 academic year, Dr. Beauchamp served on the Institute of Medicine Committee on Strategies to Reduce Sodium Intake in the United States, and after the release of the committee's report, spoke widely about its recommendations.

Select publications
Beauchamp, G. K. and J. A. Mennella. (2011) “Flavor perception in human infants: development and functional significance.” Digestion. 83.1, 1-6.
Mennella, J. A.; Lukasewycz, L. D.; Griffith, J. W.; Beauchamp, G. K. (2011) “Evaluation of a forced-choice, paired-comparison tracking procedure method for determining taste preferences across the lifespan.” Chemical Senses. 36.4, 345-55.
Mennella, J. A., Lukasewycz, L. D., Castor, S. M., and Beauchamp, G. K. (2011) “The timing and duration of a sensitive period in human flavor learning: a randomized trial.” American Journal of Clinical Nutrition. 93, 1019-24.
Mennella, J. A., Ventura, A. K., and Beauchamp, G. K. (2011) “Differential growth patterns among healthy infants fed protein hydrolysate or cow-milk formulas.” Pediatrics. 127.1, 110-18.
Peyrot des Gachons, C; Beauchamp, G. K.; Stern, R. M.; Koch, K. L.; Breslin, P. A. S. (2011) “Bitter taste induces nausea.” Current Biology. 21, R247-R248.
Peyrot des Gachons, C; Uchida, K.; Bryant, B. P.; Shima, A.; Sperry, J. B.; Dankulich-Nagrudny, L.; Tominaga, M.; Smith, A. B. III; Beauchamp, G. K.; Breslin, P. A. S. (2011) “Unusual pungency from extra-virgin olive oil is attributable to restricted spatial expression of the receptor of oleocanthal.” Journal of Neuroscience. 31.3, 999-1009.
Field, K. L.; Beauchamp, G. K.; Kimball, B. A.; Mennella, J. A.; Bachmanov, A. A. (2010) “Bitter avoidance in guinea pigs (Cavia porcellus) and mice (Mus musculus and Peromyscus leucopus).” Journal of Comparative Psychology. 124, 455-59.
Kwak, J.; Willse, A.; Preti, G.; Yamazaki, K.; Beauchamp, G. K. (2010) “In search of the chemical basis for MHC odourtypes.” Proceedings of the Royal Society. B277, 2417-25.
Beauchamp, Gary K. and Linda Bartoshuk. Tasting and smelling. San Diego, Academic Press, c1997.

External links
Dr. Beauchamp's page at Monell's website
 Harold McGee, "Extra-Virgin Anti-Inflammatories", New York Times, June 6, 2007. Describes the discovery by Gary Beauchamp, Paul Breslin, and several others of the Monell Chemical Senses Center in Philadelphia, of anti-inflammatory properties of oleocanthal, a component of pungent olive oils.
Meet Gary Beauchamp. April 2011 interview with Gary Beauchamp on website of Institute of Food Technologists.

References

Year of birth missing (living people)
Living people
Pritzker School of Medicine alumni
American geneticists